Baluli (also Romanized as Bālūlī and Balooli; also known as Bāgh Lūlī) is a village in Shamil Rural District, Takht District, Bandar Abbas County, Hormozgan Province, Iran. At the 2006 census, its population was 583, in 120 families.

References 

Populated places in Bandar Abbas County